Telmatobius ventriflavum, the Andean Water Frog, is a species of water frogs from the western Andes in Peru.

Etymology
The specific name is taken from the Latin words venter ("belly"), and flavus ("yellow"), referring to the coloration of the species' ventral surfaces.

Discovery
Specimens of the species were discovered in October 2012, during a survey conducted for the Smithsonian Conservation Biology Institute.  The population was described as a new species, separate from the nearby Telmatobius intermedius and T. rimac, in the journal ZooKeys in February 2015.

The discovery of the species was unusual, in that the surrounding area is generally considered "species-poor", and already has two species of Telmatobius frogs nearby (T. rimac  to the north and T. intermedius  to the south).  Furthermore, the type locality is easily accessible, being in proximity to the highway that connects the city of Ayacucho with the Pan-American Highway.

Description

The species is slender. The head is flat, wider than long, and makes up slightly more than 30% of the body length. T. ventriflavum has large eyes and a rounded snout; the tongue is rounded and the species lacks vocal slits.

T. ventriflavum lacks webbing on its fingers but has webbing on its toes.  Its skin is smooth both ventrally (below) and dorsally (above), but the back is patterned with miniature pustules.

Coloration on the dorsal portion of the body ranges from light golden-yellow to golden-tan, with dark brown, golden-yellow, and red mottling.  The sides are tan yellow, fading into golden-yellow or marigold on the throat and belly with depigmented areas on the chest.  Coloration of the limbs varies between sexes: in males the ventral surface is bright marigold or orange colored, whereas in females it tends to be either golden-yellow or light marigold.  The species has thin turquoise rings around the eyes, which are light grey in color.

Range and habitat

Specimens have only been collected from a single locality, a stream that drains into the Huaytará river, a tributary of the Pisco river. The surrounding area is sparse, arid Puna grassland. Most rainfall occurs between January and March.

The stream alternates between gravel- and pebble-bedded pools and small waterfalls and riffles.

The species' range is restricted by the surrounding environment, which is arid and limits dispersal.

Reproduction
The species is believed to have an extended breeding period, with the developmental stages of captured tadpoles suggesting that it even breeds during the dry period.

Threats
The construction of pipelines and roads are also a threat, as is water contamination stemming from nearby mining and agriculture.

The species has also been observed to be infected with the pathogenic chytrid fungus Batrachochytrium dendrobatidis, which causes the disease chytridiomycosis.  Infection rates were approximately 40.0% among mature specimens and 53.5% among tadpoles.  B. dendrobatidis has had catastrophic effects on other Telmatobius species throughout the Andes region of South America: the extinction of three species from Ecuador has been linked to chytridiomycosis outbreaks, as has the decline of T. marmoratus and T. timens from Peru and three species from Argentina.  T. jelskii from Peru and T. gigas'' from Bolivia have also been affected by the fungus.

References

External links
 

ventriflavum
Endemic fauna of Peru
Amphibians of Peru
Amphibians of the Andes
Frogs of South America
Amphibians described in 2015